Lucija Polavder (born 15 December 1984 in Celje) is a Slovene judoka. Polavder competed at the 2004 Summer Olympics where she didn't advance from the first round. At the 2008 Summer Olympics she advanced to the semifinals, where she was defeated by Japanese Maki Tsukada. In the bronze medal match, Polavder defeated Korean Kim Na-Young and became the second Slovenian judoka to win a medal at the Olympics (after Urška Žolnir in 2004).

References

External links
 
 
  

1984 births
Living people
Slovenian female judoka
Judoka at the 2004 Summer Olympics
Judoka at the 2008 Summer Olympics
Judoka at the 2012 Summer Olympics
Olympic judoka of Slovenia
Olympic bronze medalists for Slovenia
Sportspeople from Celje
Olympic medalists in judo
Medalists at the 2008 Summer Olympics
Mediterranean Games gold medalists for Slovenia
Competitors at the 2009 Mediterranean Games
Competitors at the 2013 Mediterranean Games
Mediterranean Games medalists in judo
21st-century Slovenian women